The Encyclopedia of Life Support Systems (EOLSS) is an integrated compendium of twenty one encyclopedias. 

The first Earth Summit of 1992, held in Rio de Janeiro, issued a document that is now famous as Agenda 21. This document refers to the Earth's life support systems, considering the whole of our planet as a grand intensive care unit that supports all forms of life (both natural and human-engineered systems).
 
The Encyclopedia of Life Support Systems (EOLSS) is based on this concept and the above definition of 'life support systems'.  It is intended to be a source of knowledge conveniently accessible at a single location, knowledge that could be useful in providing an understanding of global systems and issues with the potential to render decisions well informed to ensure the ability of our planet to support life. Unlike most encyclopedias, the contents of which are alphabetically arranged, EOLSS has a thematic organization (Theme Level, Topic Level and Article Level where Theme Level - Presentations of broad perspectives of major subjects; Topic Level - Presentations of perspectives of the special topics within the subjects and Article Level - In-depth presentations of the subjects in various aspects. Some themes have a three level structure and some two level structure. The EOLSS web of knowledge is woven over a hierarchical structure through cross reference links.). It can be regarded as an 'encyclopedia of encyclopedias (now 21 in number, presenting a wide range of major foundation subjects in a process of gradual development, from a broad overview to great detail under the following categories:
  

Within these twenty one on-line encyclopedias, there are hundreds of Themes, each of which has been compiled under the editorial supervision of a recognized world expert or a team of experts such as an International Commission specially appointed for the purpose. Each of these 'Honorary Theme Editors' was responsible for selection and appointment of authors to produce the material specified by EOLSS. On average each Theme contains about thirty chapters. It deals in detail with interdisciplinary subjects, but it is also disciplinary, as each major core subject is covered in great depth by world experts. The EOLSS is different from traditional encyclopedias. It is the result of an unprecedented global effort that has attempted to forge pathways between disciplines in order to address contemporary problems” said UNESCO Director General Koïchiro Matsuura. “A source-book of knowledge that links together our concern for peace, progress, and sustainable development, the EOLSS draws sustenance from the ethics, science and culture of peace. At the same time, it is a forward-looking publication, designed as a global guide to professional practice, education, and heightened social awareness of critical life support issues. In particular, the EOLSS presents perspectives from regions and cultures around the world, and seeks to avoid geographic, racial, cultural, political, gender, age, or religious bias.”

It is regarded as the largest comprehensive professional publication carrying state-of-the-art, thematically organized subject matter for a wide audience at the university level with contributions from thousands of experts from over 101 countries.  It is an authoritative resource for education, research and policy making in the 21st century.

See also
List of online encyclopedias

References

UNESCO
Encyclopedias of science
French online encyclopedias
English-language encyclopedias
Environmental non-fiction books
Biology books
Ecology books
Systems theory books
Globalization
20th-century encyclopedias
21st-century encyclopedias